General N.U.M. Mahesh W. Senanayke, RWP, RSP, VSV, USP is a retired Sri Lankan Army officer who served as the Commander of the Sri Lanka Army from 2017 to 2019. Senanayake had previously been the Commander, Security Forces Headquarters – Jaffna, General Officer Commanding, 52 Division and Brigade Commander, Special Forces Brigade. Having started his military career as a military engineer, Senanayake became a special forces officer and is a veteran of all four phases of the Sri Lankan Civil War, he has served in both its Northern and Eastern theaters. Following his retirement, he contested the 2019 Sri Lankan presidential election and came fourth after the three candidates of the three major political parties in the island.

Education
Educated at Ananda College, Colombo, he holds a Bachelor of Science in Civil Engineering from Jawaharlal Nehru University, Pune and is a graduate of the United States Army Command and General Staff College.

Military career

Early career
Senanayake enlisted in the Sri Lanka Army through its 16th Officer Cadet Intake (long course) on 16 October 1981 at the Sri Lanka Military Academy in Diyatalawa. Subsequent to completing his training, Senanayake was commissioned as a Second Lieutenant in the Corps of Engineers, joining the 1st Plant Engineer Regiment on 23 June 1983. He would go on to become a Troop Commander and a Squadron Commander in the same regiment, as well as being posted as an instructor at Sri Lanka Military Academy. In 1989, he took an inter-unit transfer to the Special Forces Regiment, where he served as Squadron Commander in the 1 Special Forces Regiment (1 SF). In August 1996, Major Senanayake was appointed the first commanding officer of the newly formed 3 Special Forces Regiment (3 SF) which soon specialized in Long Range Reconnaissance Patrols.

Higher command
Staff appointments he has undertaken include postings at the office of the Colonel - General Staff, 52nd Division; Brigadier - General Staff at Security Force Headquarters- Jaffna (SFHQ-J); and Directing Staff at the Defence Services Command and Staff College, Sapugaskanda. From 2000 to 2004 Lieutenant Colonel Senanayake served as the Brigade Commander, Special Forces Brigade. In 2006, having attained the rank of Brigadier, he was appointed Director Plans at Army Headquarters, going on to work with the US Army as Senior Manager, Project Management of Afghan Operations and Strategic Planning for Civil Reserved Air Fleet (CRAF). Senanyake has also held the positions of Regimental Center Commandant of the Special Forces Regiment, Brigade Commander of the 211 Infantry Brigade: Vavuniya, and General Officer Commanding the 52 Division in Varani, Jaffna.

Reinstatement
Following the results of the 2010 presidential elections, in which his former commandant Sarath Fonseka failed  to defeat incumbent Mahinda Rajapakse, Senanayake was among Fonseka's loyalists in the military to flee the country, fearing reprisals from the Rajapakses. He returned to Sri Lanka following President Maithripala Sirisena's victory in the 2015 presidential election, was reinstated and appointed Military Secretary at Sri Lanka Army headquarters in February of that year. In 2016, he was appointed Commander, SFHQ-J, during which tenure he was responsible for overseeing the ongoing resettlement of Internally Displaced Persons (IDPs) from the Civil War in the Jaffna peninsula.

Commander of Sri Lanka Army
Major General Senanayake was appointed the Army Chief of Staff on 22 March 2017, and was then promoted to the rank of Lieutenant General and Army Commander by order of President Maithripala Sirisena on 4 July 2017. During his tenure the army was mobilised and deployed on several occasions, in aid of civilian authorities when a state of emergency was declared as a result of the 2018 anti-Muslim riots and the 2019 Easter bombings bring the security situation under control. On 21 August 2019, he retired from the army, having been promoted to the rank of General. He was succeeded as Army Commander by Major General Shavendra Silva, the Chief of Staff of the army.

Political career 
General Senanayake started active politics after his retirement from the army. He contested for 2019 Sri Lankan presidential election from National Peoples Party. He assured that he will lead professionals and intellectuals to parliamentary elections in 2020. He polled fourth after the three candidates of the three major political parties.

Honors and decorations
Senanayake has been awarded the Rana Wickrama Padakkama with bar and the Rana Sura Padakkama with bar for gallantry and the Vishista Seva Vibhushanaya and the Uttama Seva Padakkama for distinguished service. 

 

His badges include: the Special Forces Regiment Badge and Tab, Sri Lanka Engineers Badge, Special Forces Badge, Parachute Badge, Qualified in Command and Staff Course Badge and the Special Forces (Gold) Service Appraisal Badge. 

In November 2021, he was inducted into the United States Army Command and General Staff College International Hall of Fame.

Personal life
Senanayake is married, and has two daughters and a son.

References

 

|-

Commanders of the Sri Lanka Army
Sri Lankan full generals
Sri Lankan military engineers
Sri Lanka Engineers officers
Special Forces Regiment officers
Sinhalese military personnel
Sri Lanka Military Academy graduates
Non-U.S. alumni of the Command and General Staff College
Jawaharlal Nehru University alumni
Alumni of Ananda College
Candidates in the 2019 Sri Lankan presidential election
Year of birth missing (living people)
Living people